A cubby is a cabinet with cubby holes, usually intended for a pre-school or kindergarten.

Cubby may also refer to:

In arts and entertainment 
 Cubby, one of the Lost Boys in Disney's Peter Pan films
 Cubby, the philosophy of The Cubby, a San Francisco-based art collective - see The Cubby Creatures
 Cubby, a character from the 2011 children's TV show, Jake and the Never Land Pirates
 Cubby (film), a 2019 American film

As a nickname
 Albert R. Broccoli (1909-1996), American film producer, usually known as "Cubby" Broccoli
 Cubby Bryant (born 1971), American radio personality
 James Davies (rugby union) (born 1990), Welsh rugby union player
 Craig Lathen, 1980s American college basketball player
 Cubby O'Brien (born 1946), one of the original Mouseketeers on the TV show The Mickey Mouse Club
 Hubert Selby Jr. (1928-2004), American writer

Other uses
 Cubby, a Logmein public and private cloud storage system
 Cubby the Bear, mascot of the Hokkaido Nippon-Ham Fighters Japanese baseball team
 Cubby, mascot of the Daytona Tortugas minor league baseball team
 Cubby-hole is a small play house for children.

See also
 Cubbies, a nickname of the Chicago Cubs Major League Baseball team
 Rockford Cubbies, a former name (1995-1998) of the Dayton Dragons minor league baseball team
 Cubby v. CompuServe, a defamation case relevant to cyberlaw



Lists of people by nickname